Arefino is a rural locality (a village) in Kiprevskoye Rural Settlement, Kirzhachsky District, Vladimir Oblast, Russia. The population was 18 as of 2010. There are 11 streets.

Geography 
Arefino is located on the Vakhchilka River, 8 km northeast of Kirzhach (the district's administrative centre) by road. Vlasyevo is the nearest rural locality.

References 

Rural localities in Kirzhachsky District